Süsskind Raschkow (also Süskind, died in Breslau, 12 April 1836) was a German Jewish poet writing in Hebrew.
He was the author of  
Yosef v'Asenat ("Joseph and Osnat"), a drama (1817); 
Hayye Shimshon ("The life of Samson") an epic poem (1824); and Tal Yaldut ("The dew of Youth") a collection of poems and proverbs (1835).

References
Zunz, Monatstage, Berlin, 1872;
Steinschneider, Cat. Bodl. col. 2664;
Winter and Wünsche, Die Jüdische Litteratur, vol. iii., s.v., Treves, 1896.

See also
Lelio Della Torre

Jewish poets
Hebrew-language poets
1836 deaths
Year of birth unknown
German male poets
19th-century German poets
19th-century German male writers